Predgorny District is an administrative district (raion), one of the twenty-six in Stavropol Krai, Russia. Municipally, it is incorporated as Predgorny Municipal District. It is located in the south of the krai. Its administrative center is the rural locality (a stanitsa) of Yessentukskaya. Population:  104,391 (2002 Census); 90,955 (1989 Census). The population of Yessentukskaya accounts for 18.9% of the district's total population.

References

Notes

Sources

Districts of Stavropol Krai